Fighter Squadron 111 (VF-111), also known as the Sundowners, was a fighter squadron of the United States Navy. Originally established as Attack Squadron 156 (VA-156) on 4 June 1955, it was redesignated VF-111 on 20 January 1959, the day after the original VF-111 was disestablished. The squadron was redesignated VF-26 on 1 September 1964, redesignated as VF-111 on 17 September 1964 and disestablished on 31 March 1995.

History

3 distinct Navy squadrons have called themselves ‘Sundowners’.  The U.S. Navy frequently has given the same designation to two or more aviation units, leading to lasting confusion.  Officially, the US Navy does not recognize a direct lineage with disestablished squadrons if a new squadron is formed with the same designation. Often, the new squadron will assume the nickname, insignia, and traditions of the earlier squadrons. In November 2006, VFC-13 Detachment Key West was redesignated as VFC-111, taking on the 'Sundowner' insignia and callsign.

VA-156, originally known as the Iron Tigers, was established on 4 June 1955 and flew the F11F-1 Tiger. VA-156 was assigned to CVW-11 and made a single deployment aboard  to the Western Pacific. VF-111 deployed the Western Pacific aboard  in 1956.

1960s
In 1961 the Sundowners' traditional mascot, "Omar," was conceived by squadron enlisted men to mark the transition to the F-8D Crusader. The triangular stick figure appeared on VF-111 aircraft and squadron spaces.  During the 1960s, VF-111 flew four different versions of the Crusader (F-8C/D/E/H).

Vietnam War

During the Vietnam War the Sundowners were based at NAS Miramar, California with the squadron (including detachments) making ten deployments to Southeast Asia, flying 12,500 combat sorties.

On 5 May, F-8D BuNo 148637 was hit by antiaircraft fire over North Vietnam and crashed into the sea. The pilot CDR James LaHaye, was killed in action, body not recovered. On 27 May, F-8D BuNo 148706 was shot down near Vinh; the pilot CDR Doyle Lynn was killed in action, body not recovered. On 12 August. F-8D BuNo 147911 was lost; the pilot, LTJG Gene Gollahon, was killed and his remains were returned in March 1974. On 3 November, F-8D BuNo 148635 was shot down; the pilot ejected successfully and was rescued.

On 6 April, F-8E BuNo 150296 was lost; the pilot ejected successfully and was rescued. On 11 August, F-8E BuNo 150880 was lost due to hydraulic failure; the pilot ejected successfully and was rescued. On 13 August, F-8E BuNo 150866 was hit by antiaircraft fire; the pilot ejected successfully and was rescued. On 23 August, F-8E BuNo 150907 was lost due to engine failure; the pilot ejected successfully and was rescued. On 5 September, F-8E BuNo 150896 was hit by antiaircraft fire; the pilot, USAF exchange officer Capt Wilfred Keese Abbott, USAF, ejected successfully, was captured and released on 4 March 1973.

Nominally an anti-submarine carrier in the Atlantic Fleet, USS Intrepid made three deployments with CVW-10 to Vietnam as an attack carrier. On 12 August F-8C BuNo 146993 was shot down, the pilot was rescued from the sea. On 26 October, three members of the squadron were killed in the USS Oriskany fire.

From 16 June 1967 to 31 January 1968, VF-111 equipped with F-8Cs was deployed on USS Oriskany. On 31 July F-8C #146993 was hit by a SAM-2, the pilot LT Charles Zuhoski ejected successfully, was captured and released on 14 March 1973. On 8 September, F-8C BuNo 146929 was lost due to electrical failure, the pilot ejected successfully and was rescued. On 5 October F-8C #146138 was shot down. Its pilot, ENS David Paul Matheny, ejected successfully, but was captured, and, after being one of twelve US POWs to accept an offer of early release by the North Vietnamese, was released on 16 February 1968. On 5 December, F-8C BuNo 146907 was shot down, the pilot ejected successfully and was rescued. On 2 January 1968, F-8C BuNo 146989 was shot down near Vinh, the pilot ejected successfully and was rescued.

From 4 June 1968 to 8 February 1969, VF-111 Detachment 11 was deployed on USS Intrepid. On 19 September, Lieutenant Tony Nargi shot down a Vietnam People's Air Force (VPAF) MiG-21 with an AIM-9 Sidewinder.

From 1 February to 18 September 1969, VF-111 equipped with F-8Hs was deployed aboard . On 6 July, F-8H BuNo 148636 was lost due to engine failure, the pilot ejected successfully and was rescued.

From 5 March to 17 December 1970, VF-111 was deployed aboard .

VF-111 had the highest combat loss rate of the F-8 fighter units deployed to Vietnam.

On 6 March 1972, LT Garry Weigand and LTJG Bill Freckleton engaged and shot down a VPAF MiG-17 near Quang Lang Airfield in North Vietnam. Their aircraft, F-4B, NL 201, BuNo 153019, was restored to the original paint scheme by the current Sundowner squadron, VFC-111, and is displayed on a pedestal just inside the main gate at NAS Key West, Florida.

From 9 March to 8 November 1973, VF-111 was deployed on USS Coral Sea.

1970s
In 1971, VF-111 joined CVW-15 and transitioned to the F-4B. The squadron later transitioned to the F-4N version of the Phantom, but was scheduled to turn these in for the F-4J. In 1975, both VF-51 and VF-111 received six F-4Js but, due to operational considerations regarding their next deployment, the two units reverted to the "N" model. In late 1976 through early 1977, VF-111 made an Atlantic and Mediterranean deployment, a rare event for a Pacific Fleet squadron, with CVW-19 aboard  for that carrier's final cruise. The squadron returned to NAS Miramar in April 1977 and began transition to the F-14A Tomcat.

By October 1978, VF-111 had fully transitioned to the Block 100 model F-14A. VF-111 subsequently deployed with CVW-15 aboard USS Kitty Hawk from May 1979 to February 1980, a deployment which was extended from its originally planned end date in early December 1979 due to the November 1979 seizure of the American Embassy in Teheran, Iran.

1980s
In addition to its "extended" deployment during the first two months of 1980, VF-111 deployed a final time on USS Kitty Hawk from April to October 1981.

In the spring of 1986 VF-111 began another work-up cycle, completing a series of training evolution and exercises in preparation for their June 1988 Pacific/Indian Ocean deployment. VF-111's seventeen month work-up was capped by FLEETEX 88-2, the first time since World War II that a carrier, USS Carl Vinson and a battleship, the  operated as a combined Battle Fleet.

VF-111's 1988 deployment began in June and ended in December. It included operations in the Northern/Western Pacific, Arabian Sea, and Indian Ocean, providing support of tanker escorts in the Persian Gulf and included a transit of the Bering Sea, the fourth such transit in four deployments.

In preparation for deployment in 1990, VF-111 deployed aboard USS Carl Vinson from September to November 1989 as participants in PACEX 89. This exercise had the Sundowners operating in the Bering Sea, the Pacific Ocean and the Sea of Japan as a part of the largest naval exercise since World War II.

1990s

The Sundowners next deployed from February to July 1990.  VF-111 received the 1990 Boola Boola award for success in exercise missile firings, as well as the 1990 Tactical Air Reconnaissance Pod System (TARPS) derby, awarded to the best tactical air reconnaissance squadron on the West Coast.

On 15 October 1991, VF-111 returned to USS Kitty Hawk for her two-month cruise from NAS Norfolk, Virginia "around the horn" of South America to NAS North Island, California following the carrier's comprehensive, multi-year Service Life Extension Program (SLEP) at Philadelphia Naval Shipyard. Multi-national exercises with Venezuela, Argentina and Chile were conducted in various air-to-air and strike scenarios. The Sundowners returned to NAS Miramar in December 1991.

In 1993, VF-111 deployed to the Pacific, Indian Ocean and the Persian Gulf and flew in support of Operation Restore Hope and Operation Southern Watch. In 1994 VF-111 deployed again to the Pacific.  Following this deployment, the squadron was disestablished on 31 March 1995 as part of post-Cold War force reductions of the Navy's F-14 community, with its aircraft reassigned to other F-14 squadrons.

Post-disestablishment
In November 2006, Fighter Composite Squadron 13 (VFC-13) Detachment Key West was established as Fighter Composite Squadron 111 (VFC-111), thus continuing the Sundowner tradition, but not the unit lineage. For more information on this later squadron, refer to the Wikipedia hyperlink VFC-111.

Popular media
 In 1985, VF-111 was one of several NAS Miramar based squadrons to participate in the filming of the film Top Gun. Some VF-111 and VF-51 aircraft were repainted in fictitious squadron markings for the film. To be able to film the sequences, the F-14s were fitted with cameras mounted in pods attached to the underbelly Phoenix pallets and the under wing pylons, as well as using ground mounted cameras. Also, one of the fictional RIOs in the film, played by Clarence Gilyard, uses the callsign "Sundown" and wears a VF-111 styled helmet and squadron patch on his flight suit.

See also
History of the United States Navy
List of inactive United States Navy aircraft squadrons
List of United States Navy aircraft squadrons
VFC-111

Bibliography
 Barrett Tillman with Henk van der Lugt.  VF-11/111 Sundowners 1942-95.  Osprey, UK, 2010, 
 Zalin Grant. Over the Beach: The Air War in Vietnam [Paperback]. W. W. Norton & Company, 2005.

References

External links
 VF-111 History
 Sundowners official website
 Topedge.com
 VFC-111

Strike fighter squadrons of the United States Navy
Military units and formations disestablished in 1995